Acacia lanceolata is a shrub belonging to the genus Acacia and the subgenus Phyllodineae and is endemic to a small area of western Australia.

Description
It usually has many branches with spinose, hairy branchlets that are covered with a fine white powdery coating at the extremities and have stipules on new shoots. Like most species of Acacia it has phyllodes rather than true leaves. The evergreen, pungent phyllodes have an inequilateral to lanceolate shape but are also occasionally narrowly elliptic. Following flowering it will produced seed pods that resemble a string of beads.

Taxonomy
The species was first formally described by the botanist Bruce Maslin in 1999 as a part of the work Acacia miscellany. The taxonomy of fifty-five species of Acacia, primarily Western Australian, in section Phyllodineae (Leguminosae: Mimosoideae) as published in the journal Nuytsia. It was reclassified as Racosperma lanceolatum in 2003 then transferred back to genus Acacia in 2006.

Distribution
It is native to an area along the west coast of the Wheatbelt and Mid West regions of Western Australia where it is commonly situated on breakaways and lateritic hills in between the towns of Mingenew in the north west, Morawa in the north east and Three Springs in the south. It is usually a part of either open Eucalyptus woodland or tall Casuarina shrubland communities.

See also
List of Acacia species

References

lanceolata
Acacias of Western Australia
Taxa named by Bruce Maslin
Plants described in 1999